Novosibirsk Thermal Power Plant 3 is a coal-fired power plant located in the Leninsky City District of Novosibirsk, Russia. It started operating in 1942.

History
In 1939, the construction of the power station began at the Sibselmash Plant.

The thermal power plant started operating on 2 October 1942.

References

Leninsky District, Novosibirsk
Economy of Novosibirsk
Coal-fired power stations in Russia